The 22423 / 22424 Gorakhpur–Amritsar Jan Sadharan Express is an Express train belonging to Northern Railway zone that runs between  and  in India. It is currently being operated with 22423/22424 train numbers on a weekly basis.

Service

The 22423/Gorakhpur–Amritsar Jansadharan Express has an average speed of 55 km/hr and covers 1087 km in 19h 55m. The 22424/Amritsar–Gorakhpur Jansadharan Express has an average speed of 56 km/hr and covers 1087 km in 19h 20m.

Route & halts

The important halts of the train are:

Coach composition

The train has standard Hybrid-LHB rakes with max speed of 130 kmph. The train consists of 18 coaches:

 16 General Unreserved
 2 Seating cum Luggage Rake

Traction

Both trains are hauled by a Ghaziabad-based WAP-5 electric locomotive from Gorakhpur to Amritsar and vice versa.

See also 

 Gorakhpur Junction railway station
 Amritsar Junction railway station
 Danapur–Anand Vihar Jan Sadharan Express
 Saharsa–Amritsar Jan Sadharan Express (via Sirhind)
 Saharsa–Amritsar Jan Sadharan Express (via Chandigarh)

Notes

References

External links 

 22423/Gorakhpur - Amritsar Jansadharan Express
 22424/Amritsar - Gorakhpur Jansadharan Express

Transport in Amritsar
Jan Sadharan Express trains
Passenger trains originating from Gorakhpur
Rail transport in Haryana
Rail transport in Punjab, India
Railway services introduced in 2014